Dduallt railway station (pronounced ) is a passenger station on the narrow gauge Ffestiniog Railway in northwest Wales, which was built in 1836 to carry dressed slate from Blaenau Ffestiniog to Porthmadog for export by sea.

Station history 
Regular use of this facility probably ceased about 1872 with the opening of Tan-y-Bwlch station (although up goods trains are said to have been required to stop at Dduallt for examination prior to passing through Moelwyn tunnel). There has never been road access to Dduallt station, which can only be reached by train or public footpaths.

The quiet station at Dduallt was first mentioned as a passenger station in 1880. It was established as a signalling block post in 1884 on the closure of Tunnel South Signal Box. It then declined steadily becoming an unstaffed halt in the 1930s (when it was landscaped by Clough Williams-Ellis who 40 years later advised on further landscaping) until final closure to passengers on 15 September 1939. Dduallt reopened to passenger trains on 6 April 1968, although passengers could not alight at the station for another few weeks because of continuing building work. The original slate water tank was recommissioned in May 1969 as an emergency supply and later a water supply was provided at the station, which was the upper terminus until 8 July 1977.

Facilities 
The present buildings at Dduallt are a water supply tank (now out of use), a stone built shelter constructed by volunteers in 1998, and Rhoslyn cottage, which latterly was always privately owned until it was bought, derelict, by the Festiniog Railway Company in 2005.

The land in the centre of Dduallt spiral is the knoll of a small hill and it is set out with an orientation table as a viewing point with extensive views over the upper vale of Ffestiniog. The knoll is a popular picnic spot in the summer.

Dduallt station is operated as an unstaffed halt and trains only call on request. Passengers intending to travel are advised to check with the Ffestiniog Railway Company before embarking on their journey.

The Deviation 

Dduallt was the starting point for the Ffestiniog Railway Deviation, the  diversionary route built between 1965 and 1978 to bypass the Ffestiniog Power Station pumped-storage hydroelectric power station, one of two pumped-storage schemes in Wales, and its lower reservoir (Llyn Ystradau). Parts of the trackless former route can be clearly seen below the new route, particularly just north of Dduallt. The old tunnel is plugged near its northern end, which is usually underwater. Some delicate engineering work was required where the new line passes over the power station pipelines.

A pull and push service officially called The Shuttle and powered by diesel locomotive Moel Hebog with carriage 110 was operated from Dduallt to a temporary terminus at Gelliwiog, before the new Moelwyn Tunnel, from 26 May 1975, during two summers, to enable tourists to experience the excellent views from the Deviation route, in advance of the opening of the new Moelwyn Tunnel. For several years before this an earlier Shuttle had run between Tan-y-Bwlch and Dduallt in between the regular trains in the peak period. It was hauled by diesel locomotive Moelwyn with a short train of 4-wheeled coaches.

Another temporary terminus known as "Llyn Ystradau" (now dismantled) existed alongside the reservoir during 1977, but passengers were not permitted to leave the station other than by train since it was on Central Electricity Generating Board land without public access.

Services

References 

 
 Brian Hollingsworth: Ffestiniog Adventure - The Festiniog Railway's Deviation Project, 1981.

Further reading

External links

 The Ffestiniog Railway Company's website
 Ffestiniog Railway Timetables 
  Multimap Map of Dduallt

Heritage railway stations in Gwynedd
Ffestiniog Railway
Railway stations in Great Britain without road access
Maentwrog